Robert G. Smith may refer to:
 R.G. Smith Award
 Robert G. Smith (aviator)
 Robert G. Smith (colonel) (1854-1923), American colonel of the Spanish–American War
 Robert G. Smith, educator, see Libby Garvey
 Robert G. Smith (candidate, 1968), see United States House of Representatives elections, 1968

Smith, Robert G.